Tetragonia implexicoma, commonly known as bower spinach, is a species of plant in the Aizoaceae, or ice-plant family. A similar species is Tetragonia tetragonioides, however this species has larger leaves and a shorter flowering time.

Distribution and habitat
Bower spinach is found mainly in coastal regions of New Zealand and southern Australia as well as on many nearby island groups. It occupies a variety of habitats from sand and shingle beaches through coastal woodland, shrubland and grassland, and as exposed, salt-pruned vegetation on cliffs and stacks. It may also be found well inland, in farmland where it is grown in barberry hedges, or on calcareous sandstone or limestone outcrops in dense forest.

Description
The stems are long and trailing, often succulent and coloured red or pink when young, maturing to dark green to brown-black and becoming woody. The leaves are alternate, clustered and semi-succulent. Leaves are rhombic to angular-ovate, sometimes bearing coarse hairs when young. The yellow flowers are solitary, strongly scented and have 12-20 stamens; 2 styles. Flowering August to November.

References

implexicoma
Flora of Victoria (Australia)
Flora of Tasmania
Flora of New South Wales
Flora of South Australia
Flora of Western Australia
Flora of New Zealand
Flora of the Chatham Islands
Flora of the Kermadec Islands
Flora of Norfolk Island
Flora of Lord Howe Island
Plants described in 1856